Eugénie Fougère (12 April 1870 – unknown) was a French vaudeville and music hall dancer and singer. She was often called a soubrette − a flirtatious or frivolous woman − known for her eye-catching outfits, frisky movements, suggestive demeanor, and for her rendition of the popular "cakewalk dance," which in her own style included "negro" rhythms and paces. She should not be confounded with the frequenter of the French demi-monde also named Eugénie Fougère although the two knew each other, mixed in the same circles and even lived in the same street in Paris for a while.

Early life and career

Fougère's past is shrouded in mystery, not in the least because she herself contributed to the ambiguities by creating dual identities in real life and on stage. According to some sources she was either from Spanish or Spanish-Jewish descent, but it is more likely that her true identity was confused with her first artistic success as a Spanish singer and dancer, known as "fausses Espagnoles" (fake Spaniards).

After the murder of her namesake in 1903, Fougère complained about the confusion over the name, about which the two ladies had argued in the past. Fourgère claimed that she was the rightful bearer of the name, but an article in Le Petit Parisien that reported on the matter, Fougère was most likely born as Faugère, in Strasbourg. According to a birth certificate Fougère was born out of wedlock as Eugénie Philippine Faugère in Strasbourg, the natural daughter of Jean Faugère, a soldier in the 16th artillery regiment from Puylaurens (Tarn), and an Alsatian woman, Catherine Kistler, a seamstress born in Herrlisheim (Bas-Rhin). She had an older sister, Justine Joséphine, born in Metz in 1861.

Eugénie became a native of Avignon in her early youth. After the 1870-1871 Franco-Prussian War, her father, who had spent twenty-one years in the army, came to Avignon in  Southeastern France with the Strasbourg pontonniers regiment, accompanied by his wife and daughters. There, he married the sister's mother in 1872, and having left the army, became a tailor. Originally from Alsace-Lorraine, Eugénie became a naturalised French citizen after the Franco-Prussian War (when Alsace and northern Lorraine were annexed to the new German Empire in 1871), shortly after her parents' marriage.

Her first appearance on stage was at the age of 12 in Avignon, and subsequently in Marseille at 14. At the age of 15 she started her career at the Café des Ambassadeurs in Paris, where she would live the rest of her life. Fougère became a popular excentric singer (gommeuse) and dancer that performed in famous theatres, such as the Folies Bergère and L'Olympia.

Cake walk
The "frenzied divette" was, in the art of music hall, a precursor, introducing songs and dances of all countries, long before that became fashionable in the café-concert circuit, while wearing the most unlikely toilets, bedecked with paradoxical colours. Just like Polaire and Mistinguett, she became known for her "racially ambiguous" dancing techniques that she applied to ragtime and the popular "cake walk" dance of the time, which became a rage at the end of 1902. She is said to have introduced the dance in Paris in 1900 in the Théâtre Marigny after she returned from a tour in the United States, where she had been filmed in 1899 in the rag-time cake-walk "Hello, Ma Baby," with which she made a sensation at the New York Theatre.

The ambiguous "cake walk" became very popular quickly and Fougère appeared on the 18 October 1903 cover of Paris qui Chante dancing to the song Oh ! ce cake-walk. The lyrics interconnected African and American dance, monkeys and epilepsy. A popular theorist of "negro dance," Andre Levinson, complied that it is impossible for Europeans to recreate the moves seen by African dance, and that is why the public is amazed by it.

While describing a revue at La Cigale near Place Pigalle in Paris in 1920, where she appeared in the costume of an American negro, Rae Beth Gordon, a Professor in French literature, notes that "at least in this original fantasy, she told the journalist, 'I felt my old self again.' The incorporation of blackness by this white singer suggests that the motivations for adopting a black persona and the effects of such a masquerade went beyond the purposes of simple exploitation. Fougère felt more at home in a black body — or, at least, in a body ruled by black rhythms and movements — than she did in a white body deprived of the opportunity to express itself with no holding back."

In the United States
The 'audacious' Fougère made her debut in the United States on September 7, 1891, at Broadway's Koster and Bial's Music Hall in New York – the gayest night spot in town at the time – where she quickly became "the craze of the hour". According to a review, "New York never saw anything to equal the performance of Fougere. Imagine an Apache in a setting of petite Parisian femininity." Her influence over the audience was due "to the sparkle, wildness and vim of her performance". Not everyone was impressed; theatre critic Leander Richardson called her "the most daring interpreter of indecency" and wrote that she dealt "in just plain sexual dirt, and looks the part".

Fougère toured the States for many years during the Gay Nineties, but her performance was often too 'strong' for the audience. Due to complaints about the audacious performances of Fougère and other European music-hall artists, Koster and Bial's had to set new restrictive rules about the artist's dresses and song texts for the 1894 theatre season.
She was hissed off the stage in Kansas City. "The people think I'm — ah — what you say? Naught-ee?," she commented. "Ah. monsieur, they don't understand. They will learn. Ah, these Americans, they are just a little slow, but they all like 'the great Fougere' when they know her. But, o-o-ooh ! I'm all breathless, c'est terrible!"

Her performances often shocked the puritan North Americans and revealed their hypocrisy. In October 1907, while she was performing at the Gaiety Theater in Washington, she was brought to the police station where she had to pay a "cash security of USD 50 to insure her good behavior." Despite the fact that the police sergeant enjoyed her show on the front row, in particular her "specialty", he nevertheless said he was shocked and dragged her off to the police station.

"Extravagant"
Fougère performed all over the world, notably in Spain, Cuba, Mexico, Germany and Italy. While performing at the Salone Margherita a café-chantant in Naples (Italy) in 1902, she contacted Camorra boss Enrico Alfano to ask for help in returning some of her missing jewelry. Within a few days, Alfano tracked down the thieves and restored the jewelry. The case hit the newspapers and Alfano was arrested for complicity with the thieves, but was absolved.

Often described as "extravagant", Fougère had many real or supposed romances that were widely reported in the media at the time, including with the American professional boxer James J. Jeffries and the Italian comic actor Vincenzo Scarpetta (it), scion of a famous Neapolitan theatre family, whose father Eduardo Scarpetta only barely prevented him from going to Paris with Fougère. In May 1906, Fougère and her husband, the actor Albert Girault (also spelled Girod), were convicted of shoplifting a night dress, lingerie, and other items one particular night after leaving a London-based textile company, Lewis & Alleby's. She was performing at the Oxford Music Hall for a substantial salary and claimed she had forgotten to pay. The charges were dismissed on appeal. She had a reputation for spending money fast.

In 1909, she made an appearance in Montreal that shocked and scandalized the audience because of the routines in her performance and the "excessive display of lingerie". A Montreal Gazette article the next day mentioned that, "Mademoiselle Eugenie Fougère, the French music hall actress, who was announced to appear at Bennett's as headliner during this week, made her first and last appearance at that theatre yesterday afternoon. Although such acts as she presented might be quite acceptable in the music halls of London and Paris, they certainly should have no place in the bill of any Montreal theatre." The manager of the theatre told Eugénie that she would not be allowed to appear again.

Later life
According to Gordon she shortly returned to stage in 1920 "after a long hiatus," in the Ambassadeurs alongside the French dancer and actress Polaire. That year, she is said to have introduced the rumba in France with the Cuban dancer Enrique Ruíz Madrid at a World Championship in Mondern Dancing, organised by Comœdia, after a long stay in Cuba. However, in an interview with Maurice Hamel (fr) for Comœdia in 1925 she complained she had no engagements anymore and about her lost fortune (jewelry worth FF 275,000 had been stolen from her).

In a retrospective in 1934, Hamel recalled her small apartment in Paris in which the walls were covered with photographs, as if she had created her own museum, in which she reminisced about her rich career. She said she had had many difficulties to correct the false notice of her death in 1903 when she was confused with her namesake. In 1937 she played a vieille coquette in the film The Pearls of the Crown (French: Les Perles de la couronne) directed by Sacha Guitry.

Legacy

Fougère was also an early example of a pin-up model; she appeared on many postcards and on a trading card for the cigarette brand Ogden's Guinea Gold Cigarettes. While in Paris from 1894–1897, the American painter Louis Kronberg made a portrait of Fougère (Dancer With Tambourine).

Gordon notes that the popularity of performers like Fougère "was comparable to that of Elvis Presley a little more than half a century later." She was the inspiration for several noted dancers, actresses, and singers of the time to incorporate the "negro" and African style of dancing she used in their routines and shows. She was also one of the pioneer burlesque music hall and theatre performers. According to Hamel she was "a precursor who introduced the repertoire of foreign songs and dances from every country into the café-concert".

After the erroneous news of her being murdered in 1903, which also made the front pages of newspapers in the U.S., a somewhat premature obituary said that "many  of her songs were insults to people of refinement, but they were clever and sparkling, and her ability to express charmingly shades of more than doubtful meaning was unquestioned."

Fougère was included in a mural in the rooftop bar of the Knickerbocker Hotel at Times Square in New York City, when it re-opened in 2015, to commemorate the time the hotel was the hottest spot in town, in the early 1900s. In 1907 she was kicked out of the hotel because she shared a room with her male manager - although they were married, as became clear later.

She was mentioned by name in the classic Frank Wedekind tragedy Erdgeist (Earth Spirit). During act I, the character Lulu stated in response to a question about her dancing, "I learned in Paris. I took lessons from Eugenie Fougère. She let me copy her costumes too." The Italian actress and singer Anna Fougez adopted her stage name as a tribute to Fougère.

Notes

References

Sources
 Bossy, Anne-Marie (2007). Les Grandes Affaires Criminelles de Savoie, Romagnat: Editions de Borée, 
 Gordon, Rae Beth (2001). Why the French Love Jerry Lewis: From Cabaret to Early Cinema, Stanford (CA): Stanford University Press, 
 Gordon, Rae Beth (2009). Dances With Darwin, 1875-1910: Vernacular Modernity in France, Farnham: Ashgate Publishing, 
 Moore Whiting, Steven (1999). Satie the Bohemian: From Cabaret to Concert Hall, Oxford: Oxford University Press, 
 Paliotti, Vittorio (2006). Storia della Camorra, Rome: Newton Compton editore, 
 Tomars, Adolph S. (2020). The First Oscar Hammerstein and New York's Golden Age of Theater and Music, Jefferson: McFarland

External links
 A performance of Eugénie Fougère, the famous Parisian chantuese in the rag-time cake-walk "Hello, Ma Baby," with which she made such a sensation at the New York Theatre from the U.S. Library of Congress.
  Eugénie Fougère (1870-1934), BnF Data

1870 births
Year of death missing
French vedettes
French entertainers
Vaudeville performers
Music hall performers